South Dakota Highway 273 (SD 273) is a  north-south state highway in Lyman County, South Dakota. It serves as a connection to SD 1806, linking it with the town of Kennebec and Interstate 90 (I-90).

Route description
SD 273 begins at an interchange with I-90 (exit 235); the road continues south as 315 Avenue. It heads north to enter the town of Kennebec, passing a couple of businesses as it almost immediately has an intersection with SD 248 (former US Highway 16). The highway crosses over a creek before passing along the western edge of downtown. SD 273 passes through some neighborhoods before leaving Kennebec and traveling north through flat farmland for the next several miles. The highway enters the Lower Brule Indian Reservation and comes to an end at Iron Nation Road, which consists of the southern terminus of SD 1806 and the western terminus of Bureau of Indian Affairs Highway 10 (Medicine Bull Memorial Highway). BIA 10 leads eastward towards the town of Lower Brule.

The entire length of South Dakota Highway 273 is a rural, two-lane, state highway, located entirely in Lyman County.

History
SD 273 came about in 1975, when South Dakota renumbered many of its highways. Previously, this highway had been unnumbered.

Major junctions

References

273
Transportation in Lyman County, South Dakota